Mohanpur is a town and a nagar panchayat in Etah district in the Indian state of Uttar Pradesh.

Geography
It has an average elevation of 164 metres (538 feet).

Demographics
As of the 2001 Census of India, Mohanpur had a population of 5299. Males constitute 54% of the population and females 46%. Mohanpur has an average literacy rate of 48%, lower than the national average of 59.5%: male literacy is 57%, and female literacy is 37%. In Mohanpur, 20% of the population is under 6 years of age.

References

Cities and towns in Etah district